Vägen till Klockrike is a 1948 novel by Swedish writer Harry Martinson. It was translated into English and published as The Road by Jonathan Cape in 1955. It was adapted into a 1953 film The Road to Klockrike directed by Gunnar Skoglund.

References

1948 Swedish novels
Swedish-language novels
Works by Harry Martinson